

Events
2 July – France wins the UEFA European Championship by defeating Italy, 2–1 following a golden goal in the final game at the Stadion Feijenoord in Rotterdam, Netherlands.

Major events in Italy in 2000:

2 

2000 in Italian television

C

Coppa Italia 2000–01
G

2000 Giro d'Italia
 
2000 Italian Grand Prix

I

Italian films of 2000

Incumbents
President: Carlo Azeglio Ciampi
Prime Minister: Massimo D'Alema (until 25 April), Giuliano Amato (starting 25 April)

L

List of Italian films of 2000

List of number-one hits of 2000 (Italy)

O

Italy at the 2000 Summer Olympics

S

2000 San Marino Grand Prix

Serie A 1999–2000 

Serie B 1999–2000

Serie B 2000–01

U

Umbrian regional election, 2000

V

57th Venice International Film Festival 

Venetian regional election, 2000

W

2000 Women's Water Polo Olympic Qualifier 

World Youth Day 2000

References

 
Italy
2000s in Italy
Italy
Years of the 20th century in Italy